Lavett is a surname. Notable people with the surname include:

 Darren Lavett (1964–2012), American music video director
 John Lavett (1926–2006), Australian public servant and diplomat

See also
 Lavette
 Lavett Bluff, in Antarctica
 Lovett (surname)